Mark McKenzie (born 17 August 2000) is a Scottish footballer who plays as a forward for Ayr United.

Career
Mckenzie progressed through the youth academy at Ayr United, and made his debut for the club on 7 September 2019 against Wrexham in the Scottish Challenge Cup, before making his league debut later that month in a 4–1 Scottish Championship victory over Alloa Athletic.

He joined Forfar Athletic on loan on 25 February 2020.

McKenzie scored his first senior goals on 16 March 2021 with a brace in a 3–1 win over Dundee.

References

External links
 

2000 births
Living people
Scottish footballers
Association football forwards
Ayr United F.C. players
Forfar Athletic F.C. players
Scottish Professional Football League players